The 2019 New Zealand Radio Awards were the awards for excellence in the New Zealand radio industry during 2018. It was the 42nd New Zealand Radio Awards, recognising staff, volunteers and contractors in both commercial and non-commercial broadcasting.

Winners and nominees

This is a list of nominees, with winners in bold.

Associated Craft Award

Best Community Campaign

Best Content

Best New Broadcaster

Best News & Sport

Best On Air

Best Programmes

Best Promotion

Best Radio Creative

Best Technical Production

Sales Team of the Year

Station of the Year

'The Blackie Award'

The Johnny Douglas Award

Outstanding Contribution to Radio

Services to Broadcasting

Special Recognition Award

50 Years' Service to NZ Radio Industry

References

New Zealand Radio Awards